Arthur Sofield Franz (February 29, 1920 – June 17, 2006) was an American actor whose most notable feature film role was as Lieutenant, Junior Grade, H. Paynter Jr. in The Caine Mutiny (1954).

Early life
Franz was born in Perth Amboy, New Jersey. His interest in acting developed while he was still a student in high school.

Military service
During World War II, Franz served as a B-24 Liberator navigator in the United States Army Air Forces. He was shot down over Romania and incarcerated in a POW camp, from which he later escaped.

Stage
Franz's Broadway credits include Command Decision (1947), The Moon Vine (1942), Little Darling (1942), and Hope for a Harvest (1941).

Film
Franz made his screen debut in Jungle Patrol (1948). He appeared in Roseanna McCoy (1949), Abbott and Costello Meet the Invisible Man (1951), Eight Iron Men (1952), Invaders From Mars (1953), The Unholy Wife (1957), and Monster on the Campus (1958) among many others. In The Sniper (1952), he played a rare lead in the film's title role as a tormented killer; earlier, he co-starred with John Wayne in the World War II film Sands of Iwo Jima (1949) and with Ronald Reagan in Hellcats of the Navy (1957).

Franz's last role was in 1982 film That Championship Season.

Television 
Franz portrayed automobile magnate Henry Ford in the 1955 television film, A Story About Henry Ford, with Karen Sharpe as Ford's wife, Clara Bryant Ford.

Franz was also a familiar face on American television series; he made five guest appearances on Perry Mason, twice playing the defendant and one time the murderer. In 1958 he played the title role of Danny Harrison in "The Case of the Married Moonlighter," and in 1959 he played Richard Vanaman in "The Case of the Golden Fraud." In 1959, he co-starred in the short-lived series World of Giants. In 1962, he played murderer Mr. Evans in "The Case of the Captain's Coin."

In 1960 Franz appeared as Matt Warner on the TV western Death Valley Days on the episode titled "The Young Gun." In 1961, Franz was cast as the historical Paine Page Prim, a future chief justice of the Oregon Supreme Court, in the episode, "Justice at Jackson Creek", on the syndicated anthology series, Death Valley Days, hosted by Stanley Andrews. Prim is shown as a drunken, ostracized lawyer who hesitates to help a miner in legal trouble but must overcome his personal demons to excel at the law. The episode also stars Dub Taylor as Jake; William Schallert as Carl Spenger, and Bill Bixby as Kinney. In 1962, he was cast as Asa Moran, an acting sheriff who abuses of his power, in the episode "The Lawmaker" of the NBC western series Bonanza.

He appeared on dozens of other series, including Schlitz Playhouse, Science Fiction Theatre, Crossroads, Ichabod and Me, Ripcord, Primus, Tarzan, Land of the Giants, The Alaskans, Mr. Novak, The F.B.I., The Mod Squad, Hawaii Five-O, Rich Man, Poor Man Book II, Custer, Mission: Impossible, Mannix, The Rookies, Owen Marshall: Counselor at Law, Storefront Lawyers, The Six Million Dollar Man, The Invaders, The Waltons, Room 222, The Virginian, Gunsmoke, Rawhide, Police Story, Medical Story, The Outcasts, McCloud, Lancer, Alcoa Presents: One Step Beyond, ('Message from Tomorrow', 1960), and Barnaby Jones.

Franz played the role of U.S. President James Madison in the 1965 episode "George Mason" of the NBC documentary series Profiles in Courage. William Bakewell played George Wythe, and Laurence Naismith played the title role of George Mason.

Franz portrayed U.S. Representative Charles A. Halleck of Indiana in the 1974 made-for-television film The Missiles of October, based on the Cuban Missile Crisis.

Personal life
Franz's third wife, Doreen Lang, died in 1999. He had previously been divorced twice. He married his fourth wife, Sharon, on February 14, 2006.

Death
Franz died in Oxnard, California, at the age of 86 from emphysema and heart disease.

Selected filmography

 Jungle Patrol (1948) as Lt. 'Mace' Willard
 Red Stallion in the Rockies (1949) as Thad Avery
 The Doctor and the Girl (1949) as Dr. Harvey L. Kenmore
 Red Light (1949) as Capt. Jess Torno (Chaplain)
 Roseanna McCoy (1949) as Thad Wilkins
 Sands of Iwo Jima (1949) as Cpl. Robert Dunne / Narrator
 Tarnished (1950) as Bud Dolliver
 Three Secrets (1950) as Paul Radin
 Abbott and Costello Meet the Invisible Man (1951) as Tommy Nelson
 Strictly Dishonorable (1951) as Henry Greene
 Submarine Command (1951) as Lt. Arnie Carlson
 Flight to Mars (1951) as Dr. Jim Barker
 The Sniper (1952) as Eddie Miller
 Castle in the Air (1952) (uncredited). This film was also called "Rainbow Round My Shoulder" starring Frankie Laine.  Franz was 3rd billed.
 Eight Iron Men (1952) as Carter
 The Member of the Wedding (1952) as Jarvis Addams
 Invaders from Mars (1953) as Dr. Stuart Kelston/Narrator
 Flight Nurse (1953) as Capt. Mike Barnes
 Bad for Each Other (1953) as Dr. Jim Crowley
 The Eddie Cantor Story (1953) as Harry Harris
 The Caine Mutiny (1954) as Lt. JG H. Paynter Jr.
 The Steel Cage (1954) as Chaplain Harvey (segment "The Face")
 Battle Taxi (1955) as Lt. Pete Stacy
 New Orleans Uncensored (1955) as Dan Corbett
 Bobby Ware Is Missing (1955) as George Ware
 Beyond a Reasonable Doubt (1956) as Bob Hale
 Running Target (1956) as Scott
 The Wild Party (1956) as Lt. Arthur Mitchell
 Hellcats of the Navy (1957) as Lt. Cmdr. Don Landon
 The Unholy Wife (1957) as Father Stephen Hochen
 Back from the Dead (1957) as Dick Anthony
 The Devil's Hairpin (1957) as Danny Rhinegold
 The Young Lions (1958) as Lt. Green
 The Flame Barrier (1958) as Dave Hollister
 Monster on the Campus (1958) as Prof. Donald Blake
 Woman Obsessed (1959) as Tom Sharron (uncredited)
 The Atomic Submarine (1959) as Lt. Cmdr. Richard 'Reef' Holloway
 Alcoa Presents: One Step Beyond  ('Call from Tomorrow ', episode) (1960) (Series 2, Episode 19) as Kevin Stacy
 The Carpetbaggers (1964) as Morrissey
 Alvarez Kelly (1966) as Capt. Towers
 The Sweet Ride (1968) as Army Psychiatrist
 Anzio (1968) as Maj. Gen. Luke Howard
 Dream No Evil (1970) as John, County Psychiatrist
 Million Dollar Duck (1971) as Prosecutor (uncredited)
 So Long, Blue Boy (1973) as Ed Rilke
 The Missiles of October (1974) as Congressman Charles A. Halleck
 The 'Human' Factor (1975) as Gen. Fuller
 Sisters of Death (1976) as Edmond Clybourn
 King Monster (1976) as Narrator
 Rich Man, Poor Man Book II (1977) as Sen. Jones
 The Amazing Howard Hughes (1977) as Barnes
 The Last Hurrah (1977) as Hack Wiles
 That Championship Season (1982) as Macken (final film role)

Arthur also appeared in a segment of "Have Gun, Will Travel"

References

External links

 
 

1920 births
2006 deaths
American male film actors
American male television actors
Deaths from emphysema
Male actors from New Jersey
People from Perth Amboy, New Jersey
United States Army Air Forces officers
American prisoners of war in World War II
20th-century American male actors
United States Army Air Forces personnel of World War II
Military personnel from New Jersey